William Baker was an 18-year-old African-American man who was lynched in Aberdeen, Monroe County, Mississippi by a white mob on March 8, 1922. According to the United States Senate Committee on the Judiciary it was the 14th of 61 lynchings during 1922 in the United States.

Lynching

Between Okolona and Aberdeen, Mississippi, 18-year-old farmhand William Baker was putting a buggy into its shed when the six-year-old daughter of Constable Sidney Johnson got into it. Baker allegedly then took the girl to a shed where she started screaming. Her mother came running and grabbed hold of him. A white mob quickly gathered and hanged Baker. His body was discovered by Sheriff Lewis hanging from a Chinaberry tree. The Chicago Whip writes the lynching took place  from Aberdeen, Mississippi.

See also
In 1914, Mayho Miller, an 18-year-old Negro boy, was lynched by a mob after an alleged assault.

Bibliography 
Notes

References

1922 riots
1922 in Mississippi
African-American history of Mississippi
Deaths by person in Mississippi
Lynching deaths in Mississippi
December 1922 events
Protest-related deaths
Racially motivated violence against African Americans
Riots and civil disorder in Mississippi
White American riots in the United States